Leschenault's rousette (Rousettus leschenaultii) is a species of fruit bat. The scientific name of the species was first published by Desmarest in 1820.

Description 
Leschenault's rousette is brown to grey-brown in colour with lighter underparts. It has long pale hairs under the chin, an elongated muzzle and large dark eyes.

Habits and habitat 
This bat species is found in a variety of habitats ranging from tropical forests to urban environments. It roosts in caves, old abandoned buildings and tunnels, and other such structures. A colony of this animal can contain up to several thousand individuals. It feeds on fruits, nectar and flowers. Leschenault's rousette is found in the Indian Subcontinent and Southeast Asia from Iran to Bali, Java and Sumatra.

References

External link

Rousettus
Bats of South Asia
Bats of Southeast Asia
Bats of India
Fauna of Hong Kong
Mammals described in 1820